Akaoa is a Cook Islands electoral division returning one member to the Cook Islands Parliament.

The electorate was created in 1991, when the Constitution Amendment (No. 14) Act 1991 split the electorate of Murienua in half.  It consists of the tapere of Akaoa and Vaiakura on the island of Rarotonga.

Members of Parliament for Akaoa
Unless otherwise stated, all MPs terms began and ended at general elections.

Election results

2018 election

2014 election

2010 election

2006 byelection

2006 election

2004 election

References

Rarotonga
Cook Islands electorates